Hamid Khan ( b. 16 April 1945) is a Pakistani writer, politician, supreme court lawyer who is currently serving as the Senior Vice-President of Pakistan Tehreek-e-Insaf. He remained member Pakistan Bar Council  and head of Professional group of Lawyers. He is senior Partner oldest Law Firm of Pakistan Cornelius, Lane & Mufti (CLM) He is remained President of Supreme Court Bar Association of Pakistan.

Social Media Profiles

Instagram

Educational Background
Hamid Khan wrote several books that are recommended reading for Pakistani students of law. Hamid Khan studied law at the University of Punjab and University of Illinois and has been practising for over thirty years.

Personal life
Hamid Khan is married to Gulnaz Khan and has three sons and one daughter. One of his sons, Sikandar, is also a lawyer. Hamid Khan has three granddaughters (Rubeena, Malaak and Sheza) from his daughter (Fizza Khan). His daughter-in-law, Shirin Sadeghi, is an Al-Jazeera English contributor. She is married to his second son, Dilawar.

Professional background
Khan a prominent lawyer has served as the chairman executive committee (CEC) & Vice-Chairman of Pakistan Bar Council, former vice-Chairman of Punjab Bar Council, former President of the Supreme Court Bar Association of Pakistan. In earlier positions he served as the President of the Lahore High Court Bar Association (1992–93). He is an Advocate of the Supreme Court and High Courts of Pakistan and is one of the founding partners of Cornelius, Lane and Mufti, a law firm based at Lahore.

Lawyer of Chief Justice
Khan was the lawyer of the Chief Justice of Pakistan, Mr. Justice Iftikhar Muhammad Chaudhry, when General Pervez Musharraf put forward a reference against the Chief Justice and Chaudhary decided to defend his case in the court.  Hamid Khan contributed considerably to the Lawyers' Movement of Pakistan which led to the restoration of Chaudhry as Chief Justice of Pakistan. Khan regularly lectures on various legal subjects at Punjab University, the Civil Services Academy, the National Institute of Public Administration and the Pakistan Administrative Staff College.

Books authored
He has authored five books on legal subjects, three of which-Islamic Law of Inheritance, Principles of Administrative Law and Administrative Tribunals for civil Servants in Pakistan-are prescribed as Textbooks at law schools. He is an Ebert and DAAD Fellow, as well as a member of The Hague Academy of International Law. His book "Constitutional and Political History of Pakistan" is taught at the LLB level, and is a comprehensive reference on the making of Pakistan. His work is also taught at the LLM level.

Selected bibliography
 Constitutional and Political History of Pakistan (Hardcover – 31 August 2001)
 Islamic law of inheritance: A comparative study with emphasis on contemporary problems (Unknown Binding – 1980)
 Constitutional and Political History of Pakistan (Paperback – 21 April 2005)
 The last defender of constitutional reason? Pakistan’s embattled Supreme Court, in: Constitutionalism in Islamic Countries: Between Upheaval and Continuity. Oxford University Press, Oxford / New York, 2011 (Rainer Grote / Tilmann Röder, eds.).

References

External links
 Hamid Khan Advocate's Profile and Photos, Movement for Rule of Law.

Pakistani lawyers
Pakistani legal writers
Lawyers from Lahore
1946 births
Living people
University of the Punjab alumni
Pakistan Tehreek-e-Insaf politicians
Pakistani textbook writers
Punjabi people
Presidents of the Supreme Court Bar Association of Pakistan
Chairmen of the Pakistan Bar Council
Vice Chairmen of the Pakistan Bar Council
People from Lahore